John Monahan (John James Monahan) is an Irish-born biochemist and CEO of biotechnology and gene therapy companies in the United States.

Education
Monahan is from County Kildare in Ireland and was educated at Newbridge College, where he was the inaugural winner of the BT Young Scientist & Technology Exhibition in 1965, his project was an explanation of the process of digestion in the human stomach.

He holds a Bachelor of Science from University College Dublin and a PhD in Biochemistry from McMaster University in Ontario, Canada.

Work and research
Monahan founded Avigen Inc in Alameda, California a company which became a leader in its sector for the development of pharmaceutical products for the treatment of serious human disease, and raised over $235 million USD through its initial public offering on the NASDAQ stock exchange.

He has directed a number of preclinical and clinical trials and led biotech and pharmaceutical research programmes.

He is current Executive Vice President Research & Development for Synthetic Biologics and sits on the Scientific Advisory Board of Agilis Biotherapeutics, LLC.

Monahan also sits on the Board of Directors at IdentiGEN, the Irish-based DNA analysis company.

References

Living people
Irish biochemists
Irish chief executives
People from County Kildare
People educated at Newbridge College
Alumni of University College Dublin
Academics of University College Dublin
McMaster University alumni
Year of birth missing (living people)
Members of the National Academy of Medicine